Lead Us Not into Temptation (German: Führe uns nicht in Versuchung) is a 1922 Austrian silent film directed by Sidney M. Goldin and starring Karel Lamač and Anny Ondra.

Cast
 Paul Baratoff
 Josef Zetenius
 Sybill de Brée
 Anny Ondra
 Marta Schlettinger
 Karel Lamač
 Carlo Rittmann
 Bela Lukacs
 Teddy Kolieb

References

Bibliography
 Bock, Hans-Michael & Bergfelder, Tim. The Concise CineGraph. Encyclopedia of German Cinema. Berghahn Books, 2009.

External links
 

1922 films
Austrian silent feature films
Austrian black-and-white films
Films directed by Sidney M. Goldin